Globig-Bleddin is a village and a former municipality in Wittenberg district in Saxony-Anhalt, Germany. Since 1 January 2009, it is part of the town Kemberg.

Geography
Globig-Bleddin lies about 20 km southeast of Lutherstadt Wittenberg on the Elbe.

Subdivisions
Globig-Bleddin is divided into the subdivisions of Globig and Bleddin.

History
Globig had its first documentary mention in 1292 under the name Globik, and Bleddin had its first documentary mention in 1376 under the name Bledin.

Economy and transportation
Federal Highway (Bundesstraße) B 182 between Torgau and Wittenberg lies 11 km from the community.

Former municipalities in Saxony-Anhalt
Kemberg